Noemí Ruiz is a Puerto Rican painter, graphic artist and teacher. She is said to be a pioneer of abstraction in Puerto Rico. Her works can be found in many significant collections, and she has represented Puerto Rico in many international exhibitions.

Education 
Noemí Ruiz studied at the Interamerican University of Puerto Rico in San Germán, where she earned a Bachelor of Arts Education and Arts Administration degree in 1953. She earned a Master of Fine Arts degree from New York University in 1956. At NYU, she studied painting, art education, supervision and administration. Ruiz also began experimentation with abstract art under George McNeil in the 1960s. At the Complutense University of Madrid in Spain, Ruiz completed took doctoral courses before studying lithography at the University of California, Berkeley.

Career 
Noemí Ruiz was acting director of the Fine Arts Department at the Inter-American University from 1959 to 1961, the same university where she earned her bachelor's degree. Ruiz is also a Founding Member of the Museum of Contemporary Art of Puerto Rico, as well as on its board of directors. Ruiz's other professions included teacher and professor, designer, department directors, lecturer, event and project organizer, amongst others.

As professor and teacher, she has worked in San German's public education system, at Inter-American University on the San German and Metropolitan campuses, and at Escuela de Artes Plasticas. She was a Department Director at the Inter-American University; Fine Arts twice, Artistic Education Program, and Art & Music.

Many times Ruiz helped coordinate and organize events and programs such as the Visiting Artists Program at Inter-American University (1976–77), Visit and Exhibition of Larry Rivers (1976–77), Art Appreciation Seminar (Inter-American University) (1968), Post Conference Tour of the National Education Association (1968), Seminars for Art Teachers - Department of Education (1962–63), and Second Seminar on Artistic Education (1964–65).

Work  
Noemí Ruiz's paintings are abstract in a non-representational style and very colorful interpret Latin American reality by using rhythmic color and alternating forms, trying to convey it all in a symbolic way. With sensitivity, discipline and mastery, Ruiz embodies her essential forms in the reality. Conceptually and symbolically, personal and natural elements can be seen presently in her pieces. Red and blue are common colors to see in her works, and at least one of the two seems to be present in every painting. She started out strictly geometric in her painting, but it melded into more organic visually, not unlike the human form and landscapes.

Noemi Ruiz uses a technique of painting in which she applies the paint with a foam roll, which allows for uniform layers of color. She would normally avoid textured painting, but has recently utilized it.  “Intention and result combine in the work of Noemí Ruiz to achieve a Latin American and Caribbean presence that proves to be outstanding in contemporary Puerto Rican art.” – Jeannette Miller, Dominican writer and professor.

List of works 
Telluric Presence

Nocturnal Mystery

Museo de Arte de Puerto Rico 
Jazz (20th C)

Caribbean land, texture and heat (21st C)

Time Space-Sidereal plan I (21st C)

Rhythm of blues and hidden labyrinth (21st C)

Shooting star line (path), a Fall wish (21st C)

Forms floating in space and breath of life (21st C)

Study-composition of form and color (21st C)

Red Space and sailboats on the time (20th C)

Blue encounter with a Mask (20th or 21st C)

Intruder coquí (20th C)

Summer's Heat (20th C)

Coleccion Reyes-Veray 
Civilización (20th C)

Talismán

Mi Isla Verde (21st C)

Tensión (21st C)

Tension (21st C)

Biaggi-Faure 
Espacio Rojo y Veleros en el Tiempo (21st C)

Recuerdo Ancestral (21st C)

Cuba: Paisaje de Playa con Destellos y Habana Blue (20th C)

Vida: Composición de Formas y Sentires (21st C)

Jardín del Pensamiento (21st C)

Collections 
Museo de Arte Contemporaneo de Puerto Rico (San Juan)

Museo de Arte de Puerto Rico (San Juan)

Cooperativa de Seguros Multiples de Puerto Rico (San Juan)

References 

Year of birth missing (living people)
Living people
Puerto Rican painters
Puerto Rican women painters
New York University alumni
University of California, Berkeley alumni
Interamerican University of Puerto Rico alumni
People from Mayagüez, Puerto Rico